Dr. Nellickal Muraleedharan (1948–2010) was a noted writer and poet in Malayalam. He received the Kerala Sahitya Academi award in the `poetry' section for his collection, Nellickal Muraleedharante Kavithakal in 2004.

Muraleedharan was selected for the Edassery Memorial award in 1985 for his book Purappad.  He also received various other awards like the S.B.T award for 'Paandi', Poonthanam award for poetry, and the K.C Chacko Award.

Personal life 

He was born in a village called Nellickal in Pathanamthitta district, Kerala State on 2 December 1948. His official name was Dr. T.R Muraleedharan Nair. He was the eldest son of late T. Raghavan Pillai and late P.P Thankamma. He did his schooling from various schools in Pathanamthitta and showed spark of talent in Malayalam from his childhood days. He had written many poems about river Pamba since he spent his childhood days playing on the shores of Pampa. He had also expressed his attachment to his parents through his poems. He was married to Sukhada Devi K., a retired school Principal. They have three daughters Smrithi, Surabhi and Sarangi.

Career 

He had completed Master of Arts [M.A] in Malayalam from Mahatma Gandhi University and worked as a Lecturer in various colleges since 1977. He took a Doctorate (Ph.D) in 1991 and was a Research guide since then. He later joined Sree Sankaracharya Sanskrit University, Kalady as a Professor in Malayalam and continued his service there till he retired on 30 April 2009 as the Head of the Department of Malayalam department.

Life as a poet and writer 

Nellickal Muraleedharan was noticed for his modern poems and was recognised in the world of Malayalam Poetry from the early '80s. His poem 'Veedu' [House] had brought him various appreciations from noted poets of that time. He received his first award 'Edassery Award' in 1985 for the book, "Purappad" which was a collection of his various poems. He had published various books since then, some of the noted ones are Viroopante Pattu, 76; Atmapuranum, 86; Purappad, 85; Kilivathil, 88; Baligatha, 91; Chitha Kadakunna Pakshikal, 92; Bodhisatvante Jenmangal, 94 (All Poetry); Nagarapuranum, 81 (novel); Sahitya Sabdakaram, 93 (Dictionary of literary terms), Nellickal Muraleedharante Kavithaakal, Nellickal Muraleedharante Kavithaakal - Volume 2, Veedu, Keralathile Jaathivyavstha, Aranmula Vallamkali, Vishwasaahithya darshanangal.
He received a number of awards for his book Sahitya Sabdakaram which is also a reference book for all Malayalam M.A students. 
His collection of Poems Nellickal Muraleedharante Kavithaakal [Poems of Nellickal Muraleedharan] fetched him the Kerala Saahitya Academy Award for the best Poet in Kerala in the year 2004. He also won a number of other awards like 'State Bank of Travancore Award', 'K.C Chacko Award', 'Poonthanam Award' for various books. He wrote some Plays, 'Poocha Sanyasi' being the most noted one among them. It was a musical and was directed and aired by Doordarshan [Malayalam]. His selected poems  Veedu was also published with a music CD containing 8 of his most noted Poems. He was one of the most noted modern day poets in Malayalam.

External links 

http://www.hindu.com/thehindu/holnus/004200505241965.htm
http://www.edasseri.org/english/memorial_awards.htm

Malayalam Poet, M.A. (in Malaylam); Ph.D Born:1-12-1948, Nellickal, Pathanamthitta, Kerala. Teaching, Lecturer & Research Guide, Sub-editor, Kerala Desam, daily, from Thiruvananthapuram; Lecturer in Malayalam at various colleges, since 1977, 
Received Kerala Sathiya Academy Award, 2004; 
Edassery Award, 85, etc.

Malayalam. Pubs. 10. 
Viroopante Pattu, 76; Atmapuranum, 86; Purappad, 86; Kilivathil, 88; Baligatha, 91; Chitha Kadakunna Pakshikal, 92; Bodhisatvante Jenmangal, 94 (All Poetry); Nagarapuranum, 81 (novel); Sahitya Sabdakaram, 93 (Dictionary of literary terms). His poems have been translated into English, Hindi & Kannada.

1948 births
2010 deaths
Poets from Kerala
People from Pathanamthitta district
Malayalam poets
Recipients of the Kerala Sahitya Akademi Award
20th-century Indian poets
Indian male poets
20th-century Indian male writers